The 1949 Yugoslav First Basketball League season is the 5th season of the Yugoslav First Basketball League, the highest professional basketball league in SFR Yugoslavia.

It was the first time the competition was held as a traditional league with every team playing every other team twice, home and away. In previous years, the competition had been held as a tournament in a single location.

Regular season

League table

Winning Roster  
The winning roster of Crvena zvezda:
  Nebojša Popović
  Tullio Rochlitzer
  Vasilije Stojković
  Ladislav Demšar
  Aleksandar Gec
  Milorad Sokolović
  Srđan Kalember
  Borko Jovanović
  Mića Marinković
  Strahinja Alagić
  Aleksandar Nikolić
  Milan Bjegojević
  Vlada Gaćinović

Coach:  Nebojša Popović

External links  
 Yugoslav First Basketball League Archive 

1949